Bypass Road is a 2019 Indian Hindi-language thriller-drama film directed by Naman Nitin Mukesh and written by Neil Nitin Mukesh. The film features Neil Nitin Mukesh, Adah Sharma and Shama Sikander in lead roles. The movie is produced by Neil Nitin Mukesh in association with Miraj Group. The film was released theatrically on 8 November 2019 With a budget 7crore and film was sleeper hit and gross above 15 Crore. The performance of Star cast was being appreciated by the critics and audiences.  .

Plot
Vikram Kapoor (Neil Nitin Mukesh), a renowned fashion designer, goes through a serious accident one night and one of his top models Sarah Brigenza (Shama Sikander) is also found dead on that night in what looks like a suicide. Vikram survives but is paralyzed and has to use a wheelchair in the rest of his life. During Vikram's absence, Radhika Nair (Adah Sharma), his girlfriend, takes over his fashion studio. Vikram returns home, where his father Pratap Kapoor (Rajit Kapur) and stepmother Romila Kapoor (Gul Panag) live and he left for years. Radhika also frequently visits his house to take care of Vikram.

Police suspects Sarah did not die of suicide, but of murder, and they take Vikram as a prime suspect, because the bullet that killed her is from Vikram's gun it belongs to Vikram's father Pratap. All though Pratap had already reported its loss. It was a different gun at the scene. Vikram is now meeting some accidents in his house that nearly killed him. The accidents however were arranged by his stepmother Romila, who wants herself and her blood daughter Nandini to succeed Pratap's assets.

A flashback shows Sarah and Vikram had a one-night stand, after which Sarah, though engaged to Jimmy (Taher Shabbir) already, wanted to be Vikram's girlfriend. After being refused, upset Sarah shot herself in an underground garage. Vikram was shocked and realized no witness would prove his innocence if Sarah was found dead there. So he loaded her "body" in the car and drove her to her house, where her dead body was later found.

At the present night, Vikram accidentally sees Romila's ex-boyfriend Narang Kapoor (Sudhanshu Pandey) sneaks into his house to secretly meet Romila, implying that the two had planned together those accidents in the house that nearly killed Vikram. Moreover, he has a strong feeling that someone around is secretly monitoring him.

Jimmy is another prime suspect of Sarah's death because he was seen in CCTV footage escaping from Sarah's house, right after gunshot was heard and soon Sarah's body was found. However, Jimmy is on the run from cops and some parts of the CCTV footage videos in Sarah's house that night is still missing. The existing part of CCTV footage also shows Sarah was alive after Vikram drove her home, but the Jimmy shows up there, and learns they have an affair. Jimmy and Vikram then had a fight, short before the gunshot was heard.

Pratap, Romila and Nandini leave for a cruise trip, leaving Vikram at home alone. The night they left, a masked man, apparently Narang, enters Vikram's house to attack and kill him. Paralyzed Vikram tries his best to escape from him, and calls his girlfriend Radhika for help, who later arrives. However, Vikram is finally caught by him and Radhika cannot save him because she cannot defeat the attacker.

Police Inspector Roy arrives Vikram's house at the crucial moment, and shoots the masked attacker. To everyone's shock, he is not Narang, or Jimmy, but his father Pratap, who is supposed to be in a cruise trip with family.

Roy now reveals the story: Sarah called Pratap to inform him that she found his lost gun, asking him to visit her house to claim it. When Pratap arrived, he witnessed Vikram and Jimmy fighting each other, so he shot Sarah to frame Vikram, the two then escaped from the house to avoid suspicion. Roy learnt this only after he arrested Jimmy, who told him this story. Pratap did not go to the cruise trip, but instead, found an excuse and returned home.
At the end, it is revealed that Vikram never lost his legs; he, along with his doctor, planned and acted handicapped to avenge his mother's death. Pratap was actually his uncle who had killed his mother for money, and also planned Vikram's accident.

Cast 

Neil Nitin Mukesh as Vikram Kapoor
Adah Sharma as Radhika Nair, Vikram's girlfriend
Shama Sikander as Sarah Brigenza
Sudhanshu Pandey as Narang Kapoor
Rajit Kapur as Pratap Kapoor 
Gul Panag as Romila “Romzi” Kapoor
Tripti Shukla 
Manish Choudhary as Inspector Himanshu Roy 
Taher Shabbir as Jimmy Brigenza
Pahal Mange (Child Artist) as Nandini	
Varun Singh Rajput as Ajay 
Errol Peter Marks as Raayo
Bhavana Rao as Sonia
Mukesh Bhatt as Kaka 
Ram Sujan Singh as Constable Ravi Singh
Yogesh Lakhani as Guest

Production
Principal photography commenced in September 2018 in Alibaug and Lonavla over a span of three months.

Marketing and release
The film's publicity design was handled by Jashoda Madhavji of Dream N Hustle Media.

The film was released theatrically on 8 November 2019.

Soundtrack

This music of the film is composed by Raaj Ashoo, Rohan-Rohan, Sharib-Toshi and Mayur Jumani while lyrics written by Shabbir Ahmed, Rohan Gokhale and Kalim Shaikh. The song, "So Gaya Yeh Jahaan" is a remake from the song of the same name from Tezaab. It's the second remake after Nautanki Saala

Reception
Filmfare gave 3 stars out of 5 and said, 'Bypass Road may have aspired to soar high as a slasher flick but faulty writing kind of clips its wings.'

Box office 
Bypass Roads opening day domestic collection was 18 lacs. On the second day, the film collected 18 lacs. On the third day, the film collected 18 lacs, taking total opening weekend collection to 54 lacs.
The lifetime collection of film was  11.6 million.

References

External links
 
 

2010s Hindi-language films
2019 thriller drama films
Films scored by Rohan-Rohan
Films scored by Raaj Aashoo
Films scored by Sharib-Toshi
Indian thriller drama films
2019 films
Films about disability in India
Films about paraplegics or quadriplegics